Ayo Adejubu is a Nigerian professional footballer who plays as a winger for Nigerian Professional Football League club Shooting Stars.

Playing career
As a child, Adejubu would sneak out to watch his favorite team, Sunshine Stars, conduct training sessions.

Adejubu initially played with the Sunshine Stars' youth team, third-tier side Akure City, before he was promoted to the first team in the Nigerian Professional Football League (NPFL) at age 14 in January 2019. He made his professional debut on 11 February, coming on for Chibundu Amah during a 2–0 victory at home over Katsina United. He "shone in his debut season" in the league, and received further attention for his performance in the 2019 NPFL/ La Liga U15 Promises Tournament. After two seasons of sparse playing time, he cemented himself as a part of the first-team squad in the 2020–21 NPFL season.

In June 2022, Adejubu trialled with the Djurgårdens IF U21 side in Sweden.

References

External links
 
 

2000s births
Living people
Nigerian footballers
Nigeria youth international footballers
Association football wingers
Sunshine Stars F.C. players
Nigeria Professional Football League players